MOA-2007-BLG-400Lb is an extrasolar planet located approximately 20000 light-years away in the constellation of Sagittarius, orbiting the star MOA-2007-BLG-400L. This planet was detected on September 18, 2008 by the gravitational microlensing by Dong. It has mass between 50% to 130% of Jupiter and orbits between 0.6 and 1.1 AU.

References

 web preprint

External links
 

Exoplanets discovered in 2008
Sagittarius (constellation)
Giant planets
Exoplanets detected by microlensing